The Seleucid era ("SE") or  (literally "year of the Greeks" or "Greek year"), sometimes denoted "AG," was a system of numbering years in use by the Seleucid Empire and other countries among the ancient Hellenistic civilizations. It is sometimes referred to as "the dominion of the Seleucidæ," or the Year of Alexander. The era dates from Seleucus I Nicator's re-conquest of Babylon in 312/11 BC after his exile in Ptolemaic Egypt, considered by Seleucus and his court to mark the founding of the Seleucid Empire. According to Jewish tradition, it was during the sixth year of Alexander the Great's reign (lege: possibly Alexander the Great's infant son, Alexander IV of Macedon) that they began to make use of this counting. The introduction of the new era is mentioned in one of the Babylonian Chronicles, the Chronicle of the Diadochi.

Two different variations of the Seleucid years existed, one where the year started in spring and another where it starts in autumn:
 The natives of the empire used the Babylonian calendar, in which the new year falls on 1 Nisanu (3 April in 311 BC), so in this system year 1 of the Seleucid era corresponds roughly to April 311 BC to March 310 BC. This included the inhabitants of Coele-Syria, notably the Jews who call it the Era of Contracts. 
 The Macedonian court adopted the Babylonian calendar (substituting the Macedonian month names) but reckoned the new year to be in the autumn (the exact date is unknown). In this system year 1 of the Seleucid era corresponds to the period from autumn 312 BC to summer 311 BC. By the 7th century AD / 10th AG, the west Syrian Christians settled on 1 October-to-30 September. Jews, however, reckon the start of each new Seleucid year with the lunar month Tishri.

These differences in the beginning of the year means that dates differ by one if they fall between spring and autumn.  Notably, the Jewish historical book 1 Maccabees generally uses the Babylonian and Judean year count (9:3, 10:1, etc.).  However, the book 2 Maccabees exclusively uses the Macedonian version of the calendar, likely because it was written in either Cyprus or Egypt.  (Both books are regarded as either canonical or deuterocanonical by certain Christian denominations.)  Elias Bickerman gives this example:

For instance, the restoration of the temple of Jerusalem by Judas Maccabaeus, approximately 15 December 164 BC, fell in the year 148 of the Seleucid Era according to Jewish (and Babylonian) calculation, but in the year 149 for the court.

Syriac chroniclers continued to use it up to Michael the Syrian in the 12th century AD / 15th century AG. It has been found on Central Asian tombstones of Christians belonging to the Church of the East well into the 14th century AD.

The Seleucid era counting, or "era of contracts", was used by Yemenite Jews in their legal deeds and contracts until modern times, a practice derived from an ancient Jewish teaching in the Talmud, requiring all Diaspora Jews to uphold its practice. For this reason, the Seleucid era counting is mentioned in the Book of Maccabees (I Macc. i. 11) and in the writings of the historian, Josephus. The Seleucid era counting fell into disuse among most Jewish communities, following Rabbi David ben Zimra's cancellation of the practice when he served as Chief Rabbi of Egypt.

References

Bibliography 
 Robert Harry van Gent. The Babylonian Calendar. Has a date converter based on Parker & Dubberstein (1971).
 

 

Calendar eras
Era
Hebrew calendar
Persian culture
310s BC establishments
311 BC